Croftfoot railway station is a railway station in South Lanarkshire that lies close to the City of Glasgow / South Lanarkshire boundary serving the Croftfoot area of the City of Glasgow and the Spittal and Bankhead areas of the town of Rutherglen, Scotland. The station is managed by ScotRail and is on the Newton branch of the Cathcart Circle Line.

Services 

Every day of the week, there is :

 2tph to Newton
 1tph to Glasgow Central via Mount Florida
 1tph to Glasgow Central via Maxwell Park

References

External links

Railway stations in South Lanarkshire
Buildings and structures in Rutherglen
Former London, Midland and Scottish Railway stations
Railway stations in Great Britain opened in 1931
SPT railway stations
Railway stations served by ScotRail
1931 establishments in Scotland